The 2019 Milton Keynes Council election took place on 2 May 2019 to elect members of Milton Keynes Council in England. This election was held on the same day as other local elections.

Election results

Council Composition
Prior to the election the composition of the council was:

After the election the composition of the council was:

Ward Results
Changes in percentage of vote share are compared with when these seats were last up for election in 2015.

Bletchley East

Bletchley Park

Bletchley West

Bradwell

Broughton

Campbell Park & Old Woughton

Central Milton Keynes

Danesborough & Walton

Loughton & Shenley

Monkston

Newport Pagnell North & Hanslope

Newport Pagnell South

Olney

Shenley Brook End

Stantonbury

Stony Stratford

Tattenhoe

Wolverton

Woughton & Fishermead

Notes

References

Milton Keynes
Milton Keynes Council elections
2010s in Buckinghamshire
May 2019 events in the United Kingdom